Anthony Savage (December 25, 1893 – January 1970) was an American football and basketball player and coach. He served as the head football coach at University of Washington in 1918 and at New Mexico College of Agriculture and Mechanic Arts—now known as New Mexico State University—in 1919, compiling a career college football coaching record of 3–4–1. Savage played basketball at Washington from 1911 to 1915 and also coached the team for two seasons, from 1913 to 1915. He also played on the Washington baseball and football teams in 1914. Savage was the older brother of another football coach, Joe Savage.

Savage return to the University of Washington in 1922 as a freshmen coach.

Head coaching record

Football

References

1893 births
1970 deaths
American football ends
American men's basketball players
New Mexico State Aggies football coaches
Washington Huskies baseball players
Washington Huskies football coaches
Washington Huskies football players
Washington Huskies men's basketball coaches
Washington Huskies men's basketball players
All-American college men's basketball players
People from Roslyn, Washington
Coaches of American football from Washington (state)
Players of American football from Washington (state)
Baseball players from Washington (state)
Basketball coaches from Washington (state)
Basketball players from Washington (state)